Julian Micevski (born September 20, 1989), better known by his ring name Ethan Page, is a Canadian professional wrestler currently signed to All Elite Wrestling (AEW), where he is a member of The Firm. 

Page is best known for his work in Impact Wrestling and is noted for his partnership with Josh Alexander as The North (formerly Monster Mafia). He and Alexander have won multiple tag team championships in several independent promotions, and are two-time Impact World Tag Team Champions, with their first reign the longest ever reign in the history of the championships. In AEW, Page teamed with Scorpio Sky as the Men of the Year and both men were also aligned with American Top Team's Dan Lambert.

Professional wrestling career

Early career (2006–2012) 
Micevski began his professional wrestling training under the tutelage of Rip Impact and Ernie Moore in 2006. He has stated he did not learn much during this time, instead gaining the larger part of his early experience on the road while traveling with Michael Elgin, whom he credits as his mentor. He made his professional wrestling debut on November 12, 2006 at a Pure Wrestling Association event in Brantford, Ontario as Julian Logan in a four-way match, which was eventually won by Indy Soldier.

Independent wrestling (2013–2021) 

On December 30, 2013, Page and Elgin as Men of the Year (MOTY) defeated Kung Fu Manchu (Louis Lyndon and Marion Fontaine) and Zero Gravity (Brett Gakiya and CJ Esparza) to capture the AAW Tag Team Championship at "One Twisted Christmas". He began wrestling for Evolve in 2014. At Evolve 84, he faced Zack Sabre Jr. for the Evolve Championship in which he came up on the losing end. During the summer of 2017, Page teamed up with ACH as the Troll Boyz. On September 22 at Evolve 92, Troll Boyz defeated the Lethal Enforcers (Anthony Henry and James Drake) to win the Evolve Tag Team Championship. On September 23 at Evolve 93, the Troll Boyz lost the titles to Doom Patrol (Chris Dickinson and Jaka). On September 28, it was revealed that he is no longer with Evolve.

On May 22, 2015, Pro Wrestling Guerrilla held its annual one night Dynamite Duumvirate Tag Team Title Tournament (DDT4), where he teamed with Josh Alexander as Monster Mafia. They defeated World's Cutest Tag Team (Joey Ryan and Candice LeRae) in the first round winning the PWG World Tag Team Championship in the process. Monster Mafia were eliminated from the tournament and lost the titles to the Beaver Boys (Alex Reynolds and John Silver) in the second round.

Ring of Honor (2014) 
Micevski worked a number of matches for Ring of Honor in 2014 as Ethan Gabriel Owens. On April 18, he defeated Zizou Middoux in a Future of Honor match. On April 25 in a match taped for ROH TV, he was defeated by Silas Young. On June 6, the first night of Road to the Best in the World was held in Carbondale, Illinois. He was defeated by Tommaso Ciampa. On June 7, the second night of Road to Best in the World was held in Collinsville, Illinois. He defeated Zizou Middoux in the opening match. On July 18, night two of the Summer Heat Tour was held in Cincinnati, Ohio. He lost a four-way match which was won by R.D. Evans. The match also included Matt Taven and Moose. On July 26 in a match taped for ROH TV, while teaming with longtime tag team partner Josh Alexander as Monster Mafia, they fell in defeat to then ROH World Tag Team Champions ReDRagon (Kyle O'Reilly and Bobby Fish). On September 6 at All Star Extravaganza VI, Moose and Evans defeated Monster Mafia, The Decade (Adam Page and B. J. Whitmer), Caprice Coleman and Takaaki Watanabe in a four corner survival tag team match.

Impact Wrestling

Early appearances (2017–2018) 

Micevski made his Impact Wrestling debut on the November 30 episode of Impact!, portraying a character named Chandler Park, who is the storyline cousin of Joseph Park. On the January 4, 2018 episode of Impact!, Park defeated Jon Bolen in his first match with the company. On the January 18 episode of Impact!, after being destroyed by Kongo Kong as a part of Kong's feud with Abyss, Park would be removed from TV.

Now using the Ethan Page ring name and gimmick, he returned on the October 4 episode of Impact! by interfering in a match between Rich Swann and Matt Sydal, costing Swann the match and aligning himself with Sydal, re-establishing himself as a heel.> On the October 18 episode of Impact!, Page made his in-ring debut, where he defeated Trevor Lee. At Bound for Glory, Page and Sydal lost to Swann and Willie Mack. In early 2019, Sydal parted ways with Impact Wrestling, thus ending their alliance.

The North (2019–2021) 

On the April 12 episode of Impact!, Page reunited with his former tag team partner from the independent circuit, the debuting Josh Alexander as the two reformed Monster Mafia, now called The North and made their in-ring debut as a team by defeating jobbers El Reverso and Sheldon Jean. On July 5 at the Bash at the Brewery 1 event, The North defeated The Latin American Xchange (Santana and Ortiz) to win the Impact World Tag Team Championship for the first time. They would retain the titles for over a year, until they lost it against The Motor City Machine Guns (Alex Shelley and Chris Sabin). The North regained the titles at Bound for Glory, but lost it again a few weeks later against The Good Brothers (Doc Gallows and Karl Anderson).

In preparation for his departure from Impact Wrestling at the end of his contract, a storyline began where Page began to blame Alexander for their losses, causing the breakup of the North. Page made his final appearance at Hard to Kill, where he was "killed" by his alter-ego, The Karate Man, in a cinematic match.

All Elite Wrestling (2021–present)

American Top Team (2021-2022)
After leaving Impact Wrestling, Micevski signed a three year contract with All Elite Wrestling (AEW). On March 7, 2021 at Revolution, he made his debut as the mystery entrant in The Face of the Revolution Ladder match in a losing effort, going under the Ethan Page ring name. On the March 29 episode of Dark: Elevation, Page formed an alliance with Scorpio Sky. Shortly afterwards, they began feuding with Darby Allin and Sting, but were defeated in a tag team match at Double or Nothing. On the June 18 episode of Dynamite (taped June 6), Page and Sky, now going by the Men of the Year, defeated Allin in a two on one handicap match. On the July 14 episode of Dynamite, Page was defeated by Allin in a coffin match, ending the feud. The Men of the Year would later align themselves with Dan Lambert of American Top Team, and from then on, accompanied Lambert while he cut his promos. This continued until the September 15 episode of Dynamite, where The Inner Circle's Chris Jericho interrupted Lambert and a match between the Men of the Year and Jericho and Jake Hager was set for the September 24 episode of Rampage, in which they were victorious.

The Firm (2022-present)
In the lead up to All Out 2022, Page was recruited by Stokely Hathaway along with Lee Moriarty, Colten Gunn, Austin Gunn, and W. Morrissey. On the September 14 episode of AEW Dynamite, the name of his group was revealed to be "The Firm" and that they were MJF's "retainer team" helping him whenever he would need them.

Personal life 
Micevski is an Eastern Orthodox Christian. He is half-Serbian ethnically.

Micevski is married and has two children with his wife. He also holds black belts in karate and taekwondo.

He is an avid toy collector and often posts his toy hunt videos on his Official Youtube Page under his pro-wrestling moniker.

Championships and accomplishments 

ACW Wisconsin
ACW Water City Championship (1 time)
 Alpha-1 Wrestling
 A1 Alpha Male Championship (1 time)
 A1 Outer Limits Championship (1 time)
 A1 Tag Team Championship (2 times) – with Josh Alexander (1) and Cody Rhodes (1)
 A1 Outer Limits Championship Tournament (2017)
 All American Wrestling
 AAW Heavyweight Championship (1 time)
 AAW Tag Team Championship (1 time) – with Michael Elgin
 Absolute Intense Wrestling
 AIW Absolute Championship (3 times)
 JT Lightning Invitational Tournament (2013)
 Black Label Pro
 BLP Tag Team Championship (1 time) – with Danhausen and Swoggle
 Deathproof Fight Club
 DFC Championship (1 time)
 Extreme Wrestling League Show
 EWLS Extreme Championship (1 time)
 Evolve
 Evolve Tag Team Championship (1 time) – with ACH
 Freelance Wrestling
 Freelance World Championship (1 time)
 Fringe Pro Wrestling
 FPW Redline Championship (1 time)
 FPW Tag Team Championship (1 time) – with Josh Alexander
 Impact Wrestling
 Impact World Tag Team Championship (2 times) – with Josh Alexander
 IMPACT Year End Awards (2 times)
 Tag Team of the Year (2019, 2020) – with Josh Alexander
 Infinity Wrestling
 GCW-NS Tag Team Championship (2 times) – with Joey Kings
 Insane Wrestling League
 IWL Tag Team Championship (1 time) – with Josh Alexander
 International Wrestling Cartel
 IWC Tag Team Championship (1 time) – with Josh Alexander
 Pro Wrestling Battle Arts
 Battle Arts Openweight Championship (1 time)
 Pro Wrestling Guerrilla
 PWG World Tag Team Championship (1 time) – with Josh Alexander
 Pro Wrestling Illustrated
 Ranked No. 123 of the top 500 singles wrestlers in the PWI 500 in 2021
 Ranked No. 4 of the top 50 tag teams in the PWI Tag Team 50 in 2020 
 Southside Wrestling Entertainment
 SWE World Heavyweight Championship (1 time)
 Steel City Pro Wrestling
 SCPW Tag Team Championship (1 time) – with Josh Alexander
 The Wrestling Revolver
 PWR Tag Team Championship (1 time) – with Josh Alexander
 Union of Independent Professional Wrestlers
 King of Toronto Tournament (2013)
 UNION Heavyweight Championship (1 time)
 UNION Tag Team Championship (1 time) – with Joey Kings
 Xcite Wrestling
 Xcite Heavyweight Championship (1 time)

References

External links 

1989 births
Living people
21st-century professional wrestlers
All Elite Wrestling personnel
Canadian expatriate professional wrestlers in the United States
Canadian male professional wrestlers
Canadian YouTubers
Eastern Orthodox Christians from Canada
Expatriate professional wrestlers in Japan
Professional wrestlers from Hamilton, Ontario
Twitch (service) streamers
TNA/Impact World Tag Team Champions
Canadian expatriate sportspeople in Japan
PWG World Tag Team Champions
AAW Heavyweight Champions
AAW Tag Team Champions